SS British Chivalry was a British oil tanker sunk by a Japanese submarine in the Indian Ocean in 1944.

Construction
The steel-hulled ship was built by Palmers Shipbuilding and Iron Company of Jarrow in northern England for the British Tanker Company, the transportation arm of the Anglo-Persian Oil Company.

Sinking
On 22 February 1944 British Chivalry was sailing alone in the Indian Ocean, south-west of Addu Atoll in the Maldive Islands, on a voyage from Melbourne to Abadan while in ballast. At 10.30 a.m. the ship was attacked by the Japanese submarine , under the command of Lieutenant-Commander Nakagawa Hajime. The submarine first fired two torpedoes. These were spotted, and the ship took evasive action, so that one torpedo passed astern, but the second hit the ship in the engine room, killing most of the crew there. The survivors abandoned ship, as I-37 surfaced and shelled and finally torpedoed the ship, sinking her in position .

I-37 took the ship's captain, Walter Hill, as a prisoner. It then moved off and opened fire with machine guns on the lifeboats. For the next two hours it circled, firing indiscriminately at the lifeboats and men in the water before finally moving off. Fourteen men were killed and another five mortally wounded. The thirty-eight survivors were adrift for 37 days before finally being rescued by the British cargo liner MV Delane. Captain Hill was held as a prisoner at Penang until the end of the war.

He was found guilty and sentenced to eight years hard labour at Sugamo Prison, Tokyo, but was released in 1954 after only six years, following the end of the Allied occupation. It was not until 1978 that it was revealed that Nakagawa, while in command of the submarine , had also been responsible for the sinking of the Australian hospital ship  in April 1943, with the loss of 268 lives.

The men killed aboard British Chivalry are commemorated on Panel 19 of the Tower Hill Memorial in London.

References

1929 ships
Ships built on the River Tyne
World War II merchant ships of the United Kingdom
World War II shipwrecks in the Indian Ocean
Ships sunk by Japanese submarines
Maritime incidents in February 1944
Oil tankers